Yahya al-Hajuri is a salafist scholar, who managed the Dar al-Hadith al-Khayriyya madrassa in Dammaj, Yemen.

He leads the Hajoor tribe which is the dominant tribe in northern Yemen. On January 19, 2020 renewed clashes between the Houthis and the Hajoor occurred. The first clashes between the two was in 2014, before the civil war broke out, the Houthis fought the Hajoor for control of Saada province. Yahya was eventually forced from the province and his prominent Salafi religious centre in Damaj was bombed. The Houthi rebels went on to seize the capital Sanaa, starting the current civil war.

The Countering Terrorism Center cited al-Hajuri as an example of the breadth of opinions in Salafism, noting he opposed violence, and supported the 2006 re-election bid of Yemeni President Ali Abdullah Salih.

An article in Islam and Christian-Muslim Relations named al-Hajuri, together with Muhammad Nasir al-Din al-Albani, ‘Abd al-‘Aziz bin Baz and Muhammad Salih al-‘Uthaymin as "contemporary Middle Eastern Muslim scholars" who were "influential exponents of NTS (neo-traditional Salafi manhaj)".

References

Year of birth missing (living people)
Living people
Yemeni Islamists
Yemeni Salafis
20th-century Yemeni people